Charles Oakes (10 August 1912 – 19 December 2007) was an English cricketer active from 1935 to 1954 who played for Sussex. He was born in Horsham and died in Tonbridge. A noted all rounder, he appeared in 288 first-class matches as a righthanded batsman who bowled leg break and googly (LBG). He scored 10,893 runs with a highest score of 160 among fourteen centuries and took 458 wickets with a best performance of eight for 147. Oakes was awarded his county cap by Sussex in 1937 and had a benefit season in 1954 which raised £4,100. He was the elder brother of Jack Oakes.

Notes

1912 births
2007 deaths
English cricketers
Marylebone Cricket Club cricketers
Sussex cricketers
North v South cricketers